The Prior of Whithorn was the head of the monastic community at Whithorn Priory, attached to the bishopric of Galloway at Whithorn. It was originally an Augustinian establishment, but became Premonstratensian by the time of the second or third known prior. As most of the priors of Whithorn appear to be native Galwegian Gaels, it would appear that most priors before the 16th century at least were drawn from region, something unusual in medieval Scotland. The following is a list of abbots and commendators.

List of priors of Whithorn

 Edanus (Adam or Áedan), 1154 x 1161
 William (?), 1172x1178
 Michael, 1200 x 1209.
 Malcolm, 1209 x 1226
 Paul, 1217 x 1235
 Duncan, 1235
 Gregory, 1235 x1253
 Duncan, 1273
 Dungal, 1279
 Thomas, 1287
 John, 1293 -1294
 Maurice, 1296
 Michael MacKenlagh (or de Makenlagh), 1355
 Gilbert, 1382-1413
 Thomas "Macilhachnisi" ("Makillehachuyfy"), 1413 -1431
 James Cameron, 1446
 William Douglas, 1447-1467 x 1468
 Fergus MacDowell, 1466-1470
 David Ralston, 1468
 David Lindsay, 1470
 Roger, 1473
 Patrick Vaus, 1474 -1503
 Patrick McCathroge [MacCaffrey?], x 1477
 Thomas Adunnale, 1470s
 Henry MacDowell, 1503-1514 x 1516

List of commendators

 Alexander Stewart de Pitcairne, 1516-1518
 Silvio Passarini, 1516-1526
 Gavin Dunbar, 1518-1524
 William Dick, 1520
 John Maxwell, 1524
 Ninian Fleming, 1524-1537 x 1539
 Abraham Vaus, 1532
 Malcolm Fleming, 1539-1568
 Robert Stewart, 1568-1581 x 1582
 William Fleming, 1568-1594
 Patrick Stewart, 1582-1605
 Gavin Hamilton, 1605-1612

Notes

Bibliography
 Donaldson, Gordon, "The Bishops and Priors of Whithorn", in Dumfriesshire and Galloway Natural History & Antiquarians Society: Transactions and Journal of Proceedings, Third Series, vol. 27 (1950), pp. 127–54 
 Dowden, John, The Bishops of Scotland, ed. J. Maitland Thomson, (Glasgow, 1912)
 Watt, D.E.R. & Shead, N.F. (eds.), The Heads of Religious Houses in Scotland from the 12th to the 16th Centuries, The Scottish Records Society, New Series, Volume 24, (Edinburgh, 2001), pp. 216–20

See also
 Whithorn Priory
 Bishop of Galloway

Whithorn
Whithorn
Whithorn